Hon Robyn McDonald is a former New Zealand politician.

Member of Parliament

She was an member of parliament from 1996 to 1999, representing the New Zealand First party. She was first elected to Parliament in the 1996 election as a list MP, and was appointed as Minister of Consumer Affairs and Minister for Senior Citizens. When New Zealand First splintered, she was one of the MPs who remained with the party core.

Later career
In the 1999 election, however, she was ranked in 20th place on the New Zealand First party list, and was not returned to Parliament. Later, McDonald was appointed to a position in Development Wainuiomata, an organisation promoting economic and population growth in the Wainuiomata area. She is now working as National Chief Executive for the RNZSPCA and is known as Robyn Kippenberger.

References

Year of birth missing (living people)
Living people
New Zealand First MPs
Women members of the New Zealand House of Representatives
New Zealand list MPs
Members of the New Zealand House of Representatives
Unsuccessful candidates in the 1999 New Zealand general election